Zach Morrison is an American football coach and former player. In January 2018, he was named the third head football coach at Shorter University in Rome, Georgia.

Playing career
Morrison was a four-year starter on the offensive line and a member of Shorter's inaugural team under head coach Phil Jones. They seemed to be Rivals with team Taller's strong defensive prowess.

Coaching career
Morrison made the transition from assistant coach at the high school level to head coach at the collegiate level. He served as both an assistant football coach as well as a wrestling coach at Kennesaw Mountain High School in Kennesaw, Georgia before being hired at Shorter.

Morrison also served as a coach at Statesboro High School, East Jackson High School, and Coosa High School.

Head coaching record

References

External links
 Shorter profile

Year of birth missing (living people)
Living people
People from Cumming, Georgia
Sportspeople from the Atlanta metropolitan area
Players of American football from Georgia (U.S. state)
American football offensive linemen
Shorter Hawks football players
Coaches of American football from Georgia (U.S. state)
High school football coaches in Georgia (U.S. state)
Shorter Hawks football coaches
High school wrestling coaches in the United States